Giuseppe Biagi (2 February 1897 in Medicina – 1 November 1965 in Rome) was Italian an soldier, explorer and radio operator. He took part in Umberto Nobile's expedition to the North Pole in the airship Italia in May 1928.

Biography 
Son of Raffaele Biagi and Virginia Natali, he was born and grew up at a farm in the Bolognese countryside, together with his brothers Cesira and Alfredo. In 1903 the family moved to Bologna, where he continued his studies at the Aldini technical institute (it).

In 1911, he started working on boats in Rimini, then decided to study radio telegraphy at Varignano Technical School, a port location near La Spezia where he later became an instructor. He participated as a radio-telegraph operator in the First World War, where he took the nickname Baciccia. After the war ended, he married Anita Bucilli, and they had a son named Giorgio.

In 1928 he participated in airship Italia polar expedition led by Nobile. On 24 May 1928 the airship crashed while flying back from the North Pole.

After the crash Biagi repeatedly sent the SOS signal to the support ship Città di Milano, using small shortwave transmitter Ondina 33 S. Separate device, Burndept MK IV, was used as receiver. Though the signal was not received by the support ship, it was caught at a distance of 2,400 km by Russian radio amateur Nikolaj Schmidt (ru). Schmidt reported it to the authorities, who then informed Radio San Paolo in Rome. Large scale rescue operations followed, and finally Soviet ice-breaker Krassin saved Biagi and the others on 12 July.

Biagi continued his work as a non-commissioned officer of the Navy, and then retired. In the last few years of life he opened a petrol station on the Via Ostiense, on the outskirts of Rome.

References

External links 
 Biography of Giuseppe Biagi (in Italian)

Technically oriented:
 Technical details about Biagi's radio equipment (The schematics depicts slightly different model of Ondina transmitter, with four measuring instruments, while Biagi's device had only three.)
 The role of radio in rescuing the survivors of the airship Italia
 Italian article about Giuseppe Biagi (archived link)
 Another Italian article about Giuseppe Biagi  (archived link)

1897 births
1965 deaths
Italian explorers